Constantin Cernăianu (12 October 1933 – 22 June 2015) was a Romanian football player and coach.

As a manager, Cernăianu won league titles with non-Bucharest based clubs, Petrolul Ploiești and Universitatea Craiova.

Managerial honours
Petrolul Ploiești
Romanian League: 1965–66

Universitatea Craiova
Romanian League: 1973–74; runner-up 1972–73
Romanian Cup runner-up: 1974–75

Olympiakos Nicosia
Cypriot Second Division: 1983–84
Cypriot Cup runner-up: 1990–91

Romania
World University Championships Romania: 1972 
World University Championships France: 1974

Romania U20
FIFA U-20 World Cup Bronze medal: 1981

References

External links
Profesorul Constantin Cernaianu 
Constantin Cernaianu at Labtof.ro

1933 births
2015 deaths
Sportspeople from Târgu Jiu
Romanian footballers
Association football midfielders
CS Pandurii Târgu Jiu players
FC Sportul Studențesc București players
Romanian football managers
FC Petrolul Ploiești managers
CS Universitatea Craiova managers
FC Steaua București managers
FC Dinamo București managers
Olympiakos Nicosia managers
FC Rapid București managers
Romanian expatriate football managers
Romania national football team managers
Expatriate football managers in Cyprus
Romanian expatriate sportspeople in Cyprus